In It to Win It is the first full-length album by American punk rock band City Lights, released on November 8, 2011. It was InVogue Records first release to land on any Billboard chart, having debuted at number 29 on Alternative New Artist and 117 on Top New Artist. The album was recorded and produced by Nick Ingram at Capital House Records in Galena, Ohio. The band went through a number of line-up changes between their first EP Rock Like a Party Star and the recording of this album.

Background

Signing to InVogue Records 
In 2011, bassist Chase Clymer contacted the CEO of Ohio-based record label InVogue Records, Nick Moore. Clymer negotiated a one album deal with Moore, the band signed to InVogue Records in May 2011. A press release stated the band had recently signed with InVogue Records and would be releasing their debut record on July 26, the album was later pushed back to November 8, 2011. The first single from the album "Where You've Been" was released on October 17, 2011 in the run up to the album's release, a music video accompanied the single and was directed by Duncan Johnson.

Reception 
Upon release, the album received some moderate success, shooting the band onto the Billboard music charts. While some critics struggled to get on side with the album, it has become a seminal record among the easycore community. Alternative Press published a review claiming the band were "...five young men taking themselves far too seriously."

Track listing
All songs written by City Lights.

Personnel
 Oshie Bichar – vocals
 Jeremy Smith – lead guitar, backing vocals
 Kamron Bradbury – rhythm guitar
 Chase Clymer – bass guitar, backing vocals
 Sean Smith – drums

Additional personnel
 Caleb Shomo – backing vocals

References 

2011 debut albums